Rolf Georg Schneider (born 17 March 1940, Hagen, Germany) is a mathematician. Schneider is a professor emeritus at the University of Freiburg. His main research interests are convex geometry and stochastic geometry.

Career
Schneider completed his PhD 1967 with Ruth Moufang at Goethe University Frankfurt with a thesis titled  (Elliptisch gekrümmte Hyperflächen in der affinen Differentialgeometrie im Großen). In 1969, he got his Habilitation in Bochum. In 1970, he was appointed as a full professor at TU Berlin and in 1974 at the University of Freiburg.

He became a Fellow of the American Mathematical Society in 2014 and received an honorary doctorate of the University of Salzburg in the same year.

Research
Rolf Schneider is known for his solution of Shephard's problem, his books on  stochastic and integral geometry, and his comprehensive monography on the Brunn–Minkowski theory.

References

1940 births
Living people
20th-century German mathematicians
21st-century German mathematicians
Fellows of the American Mathematical Society
People from Hagen
Goethe University Frankfurt alumni
Academic staff of the Technical University of Berlin